Lake Yamma Yamma is an ephemeral lake on the Cooper Creek system in the arid Channel Country of south-western Queensland, Australia.  The lake, which is sometimes called Lake Mackillop, is the largest inland ephemeral lake in Queensland.

Description
The lake only holds water following major floods on Cooper Creek. It fills to capacity only about once every 25–30 years, most recently in 2000. The lake waters are fresh immediately after filling, but become increasingly saline as the lake dries out. When dry, the lake bed's cracking grey clay soils support extensive grasslands dominated by rat's tail couch. Several ephemeral forbs grow among the couch following rain or minor flooding. The north-eastern section supports open lignum shrubland with patches of open woodland dominated by coolabah and Belalie.

Birds
The lake, with its associated seasonal claypans and the nearby Barrolka Lakes to the north-east, has been identified by BirdLife International as a  Important Bird Area (IBA) because it has supported over 1% of the world populations of plumed whistling-ducks, sharp-tailed sandpipers and Australian pelicans, as well as providing habitat for Australian bustards.  A large colony of Australian pelicans breeds on an island at the north-eastern end of the lake.  The Barrolka Lakes hold several cormorant colonies.  Other birds recorded in substantial numbers include hardheads, white-headed stilts, glossy ibises, grey teals, black-tailed nativehens, Australian pratincoles, whiskered terns and Pacific black ducks, with smaller numbers of freckled ducks and white-winged black terns.

See also

List of lakes of Australia

References

Important Bird Areas of Queensland
Yamma Yamma
Lake Eyre basin
South West Queensland
Yamma Yamma, Lake